William Kevin Rowell (27 October 1927 – 10 October 1986) was an Australian prelate of the Catholic Church.

Born in Korumburra, Victoria, Rowell was ordained to the priesthood in 1954. In 1969, he was appointed bishop of Aitape, Papua New Guinea, serving from 1970 until his death in 1986 at the age of 58.

References

1927 births
1986 deaths
Australian expatriates in Papua New Guinea
People from Korumburra
20th-century Roman Catholic bishops in Papua New Guinea
Roman Catholic bishops of Aitape